Malíkovice is a municipality and village in Kladno District in the Central Bohemian Region of the Czech Republic. It has about 400 inhabitants.

Administrative parts
Villages of Čanovice and Hvězda are administrative parts of Malíkovice.

References

Villages in Kladno District